The Naked Soul of Sweet Jones is the third solo studio album by American rapper Pimp C. It was released through Rap-A-Lot Records and Universal Motown Records on October 5, 2010, making it his first posthumous solo release. The album features guest appearances from Bun B, Da Underdawgz, BankRoll Jonez, Young Bub, Chamillionaire, Cory Mo, Drake, E-40, Hezeleo, Ivory P., Jazze Pha, J-Dawg, Lil' Boosie, Rick Ross, Slim Thug, The Gator Mane, Too $hort, Webbie and Young Jeezy.

The album debuted at number 25 on the Billboard 200, and has sold 18,000 units in its first week in the United States.

Track listing 

Sample credits
Track 1 contains an interpolation of "If You Let Me" written by Frank Wilson and performed by Eddie Kendricks.

Charts

References

External links

2010 albums
Pimp C albums
Rap-A-Lot Records albums
Albums published posthumously
Albums produced by Boi-1da
Albums produced by Jazze Pha
Albums produced by David Banner
Albums produced by Mike Dean (record producer)